Wilm or WILM may refer to:

Radio stations
WILM (AM), a radio station (1450 AM) in Wilmington, Delaware, United States
WILM-LD, a low-powered television station (channel 15, virtual 10) licensed to serve Wilmington, North Carolina, United States

People
Alfred Wilm (1869–1937), German metallurgist
Clarke Wilm (born 1976), Canadian ice hockey player
Eike Wilm Schulte (born 1939), German operatic baritone